Kevin Bradley Newman (born August 4, 1993) is an American professional baseball shortstop for the Cincinnati Reds of Major League Baseball (MLB). He has previously played in MLB for the Pittsburgh Pirates. Newman played college baseball for the Arizona Wildcats of the University of Arizona, before the Pirates selected him in the first round of the 2015 MLB draft. He made his MLB debut in 2018.

Amateur career
Newman graduated from Poway High School in Poway, California. He made the school's varsity baseball team in his sophomore year. Newman had a .404 batting average in his junior year, and was pursued by the University of Arizona, University of Oregon, and the University of California, Los Angeles. He committed to attend Arizona on a college baseball scholarship to play for the Arizona Wildcats baseball team.

Newman succeeded Alex Mejia as the Wildcats' starting shortstop as a freshman. In his freshman year, Newman had a .336 batting average, the 11th best in the Pac-12 Conference (Pac-12). He was named to the Freshman All-America team by Louisville Slugger, and was the only freshman named to the All-Pac-12 Conference team. He had a .304 batting average as a sophomore, and was again named to the Pac-12's All-Conference team. He was added to the Golden Spikes Award watch list before his junior year. Newman also played summer collegiate baseball for the Falmouth Commodores of the Cape Cod Baseball League (CCBL) in the summers of 2013 and 2014, winning the league's batting average title in both years, and the league MVP award in 2014. He was named to the CCBL Hall of Fame in 2020. In 2015, Newman was named to the All-Pac-12 Conference team.

Professional career

Pittsburgh Pirates
The Pittsburgh Pirates selected Newman in the first round, with the 19th overall selection, of the 2015 MLB draft. He signed with the Pirates and reported to the West Virginia Black Bears of the Class A-Short Season New York–Penn League to make his professional debut. The Pirates promoted Newman to the West Virginia Power of the Class A South Atlantic League in August. In 61 combined games between the two teams, he posted a .257 batting average with two home runs, 17 RBIs and 13 stolen bases. He began the 2016 season with the Bradenton Marauders of the Class A-Advanced Florida State League, and was later promoted to the Altoona Curve of the Class AA Eastern League; in 102 total games, he batted .320 with five home runs and 52 RBIs. In 2017, he played for both Altoona and the Indianapolis Indians of the Class AAA International League, batting a combined .267 with four home runs, 41 RBIs and a .675 OPS in 122 total games.

MLB.com ranked Newman as Pittsburgh's seventh-best prospect going into the 2018 season. He played 102 games for Indianapolis, batting .302, before the Pirates promoted him to the major leagues on August 16.

On April 6, 2019 Newman hit his first walk off, a single to help the Pirates defeat the Cincinnati Reds 6-5 in 10 innings. In 2019 he batted .308/.353/.446, tied for the National League lead in infield hits (22), and led the NL in at bats per strikeout (8.0).

In 2020 for Pittsburgh, Newman slashed .224/.281/.276 with 1 home run and 10 RBIs.

In 2021 he batted .226/.265/.309, and had the lowest OPS in the major leagues, at .574. However, he also led the major leagues in at bats per strikeout (12.6).

Newman began the 2022 season on the injured list with a groin injury, and was placed on the 60-day injured list on May 23 after suffering a hamstring-related setback while rehabbing with Triple-A Indianapolis.

Cincinnati Reds
On November 18, 2022, Newman was traded to the Cincinnati Reds for pitcher Dauri Moreta.

Personal
Newman and his wife, Shayne, welcomed their first child, a daughter, in January 2021. They reside in Chandler, Arizona.

References

External links

Living people
1993 births
People from Poway, California
Baseball players from California
Major League Baseball infielders
Pittsburgh Pirates players
Arizona Wildcats baseball players
West Virginia Black Bears players
West Virginia Power players
Bradenton Marauders players
Altoona Curve players
Indianapolis Indians players
Falmouth Commodores players